Kalyangirija Dam, is an earthfill dam on Kalyangirija river near Jalna in the state of Maharashtra in India.

Specifications

Purpose
 Irrigation

See also
 Dams in Maharashtra
 List of reservoirs and dams in India

References

Dams in Jalna district
Dams completed in 1972
1972 establishments in Maharashtra